Tracey Freeman (born 1948) is an Australian Paralympic athlete who won ten medals at two Paralympics.

Personal
Freeman became a quadriplegic due to polio at the age of two in 1951, while living in the Queensland city of Mount Isa. She went to the Crippled Children's Centre in the Sydney suburb of Redfern until the age of 15, when she moved to the Mt Wilga Rehabilitation Centre. She developed a passion for sports competition, having been introduced to archery, field events and swimming during her rehabilitation. She then moved with her family back to Queensland and spent time at the Kingsholm Rehabilitation Centre in Brisbane. She married shortly before the 1972 Heidelberg Paralympics.

Career
Freeman's first national competition was the National Wheelchair Games in Sydney, where she won all the events she entered; she broke Australian records in discus, javelin, shot put and the 60 m sprint, and won a gold medal in table tennis. She was therefore selected for a place in the Australian team at the 1972 Heidelberg Paralympics, where she won three gold medals and broke world records in the Women's Discus 1B, Women's Javelin 1B, and Women's Shot Put 1B events, and two silver medals in the Women's 60 m Wheelchair 1B and Women's Slalom 1B events. she was the most successful athlete at the games, the first Australian woman to win a gold medal at a Paralympic athletics competition, and one of Australia's first high-profile Paralympic competitors.

She defended her national titles in athletics events at the 1973 National Wheelchair Games in Adelaide and won a gold medal in the wheelchair slalom. She broke games records at the 1974 Commonwealth Paraplegic Games in Dunedin and won gold medals in the discus and shot put and silver medals in the 60 m and slalom at the first FESPIC Games in Japan the following year. At the 1976 Toronto Games, she won three gold medals and three world records in the Women's 60 m 1C, Women's Javelin 1C, and Women's Shot Put 1C events, and two silver medals in the Women's Discus 1C and Women's Slalom 1C events. She hoped to participate in the 1980 Arnhem Paralympics but a car accident just before the games forced her to withdraw from the competition. She made a comeback in the early 1990s, when she once again won medals in national competitions and set Australian records, before retiring in 1996.

Recognition
In 1976, Freeman became the first athlete with a disability to win The Courier-Mail Sportswoman of the Year award. In 2000, she received an Australian Sports Medal. The Sporting Wheelies and Disabled Association's Tracey Freeman Athlete of the Meet award is named after her. In December 2016, Freeman was inducted into the Australian Paralympic Hall of Fame.

References

External links
 Tracey Freeman – Athletics Australia Results

1940s births
Living people
Paralympic athletes of Australia
Athletes (track and field) at the 1972 Summer Paralympics
Athletes (track and field) at the 1976 Summer Paralympics
Medalists at the 1972 Summer Paralympics
Medalists at the 1976 Summer Paralympics
Paralympic gold medalists for Australia
Paralympic silver medalists for Australia
Paralympic medalists in athletics (track and field)
Wheelchair category Paralympic competitors
People with polio
People with tetraplegia
Sportswomen from Queensland
Recipients of the Australian Sports Medal
Australian female discus throwers
Australian female javelin throwers
Australian female shot putters
Australian female wheelchair racers
Wheelchair discus throwers
Wheelchair javelin throwers
Wheelchair shot putters
Paralympic discus throwers
Paralympic javelin throwers
Paralympic shot putters